Hilalpur is a Gram panchayat in Hajipur,  Vaishali District, Bihar.

Geography
This panchayat is located at

panchayat office
Panchayat Bhawan Hilalpur (पंचायत भवन Hilalpur )

Nearest City/Town
Hajipur (Distance 4 km)

Nearest major road highway or river
NH 103 (National highway 103)
And 
Railway line

compass

Villages in panchayat
There are  villages in this panchayat

References

Gram panchayats in Bihar
Villages in Vaishali district
Vaishali district
Hajipur